Other Halves is a 1984 New Zealand film directed by John Laing.
The film is based on a book by Sue McCauley.

Synopsis
A relationship develops between a Maori boy in drug rehab and a married Pākehā woman when they meet in a psychiatric hospital.

Cast

Reviews
Wellington Film Society - "The film is littered with dichotomies...".

References

External links
 

1984 films
1980s New Zealand films
1980s English-language films
Films about Māori people
Films directed by John Laing
New Zealand drama films